Wadi al Baldah, is a wadi located in the state of Madina, Saudi Arabia. This valley mentioned in early Islamic sources.

Reference 

Valleys of Saudi Arabia